The Seram blind skink (Dibamus seramensis) is a legless lizard endemic to Seram.

References

Dibamus
Reptiles of Indonesia
Reptiles described in 1985
Taxa named by Allen Eddy Greer